Chaq Qarah (also Romanized as Chāq Qarah; also known as Chāhqarah) is a village in Firuzeh Rural District, in the Central District of Firuzeh County, Razavi Khorasan Province, Iran. At the 2006 census, its population was 99, in 23 families.

References 

Populated places in Firuzeh County